Blair W. Effron (born 1962) is an American financier.  Effron co-founded Centerview Partners, a leading global investment banking firm based in New York City. Centerview has offices in London, Paris, Chicago, Los Angeles, Palo Alto and San Francisco. The firm provides advice on mergers and acquisitions, financial restructurings, valuation, and capital structure to companies, institutions and governments.
 
Effron is also active in Democratic Party politics and was a prominent supporter of John Kerry's 2004 presidential campaign, as well as subsequent presidential campaigns for Barack Obama, Hillary Clinton and Joe Biden.

Early life
Effron grew up in a Jewish family in Poughkeepsie, New York, son of James W. Effron, president of Effron Oil. Effron graduated with a BA in history from Princeton University in 1984 and an MBA from Columbia Business School in 1986.  He began his career at Dillon, Read & Co. and would remain with the firm and its successors (Warburg Dillon Read, UBS Warburg and UBS Investment Bank) over the next 20 years.  Effron received a brief mention as an associate at Dillon Read in the Barbarians at the Gate involved in the buyout of RJR Nabisco by Kohlberg Kravis Roberts & Co.

Career

Effron began his career in investment banking in the early 1980s and built up a reputation as one of the leading bankers in the consumer products industry and for more than ten years since founding Centerview has been one of the industry's top generalist banker across several industries.  At UBS, Effron was Group Vice Chairman of UBS AG and a member of the Board of UBS Investment Bank, where he also sat on several management committees.  Effron's major coup came in 2005 when he advised Gillette on its $57 billion sale to Procter & Gamble, which was the largest mergers and acquisitions transaction of 2005.  Among Effron's other major deals are:
 General Electric's sale of $200B of financial assets. 
 Time Warner Cable on its $79 billion merger with Charter Communications. 
 21st Century Fox on $71.3 billion transactions with The Walt Disney Company. 
 Kraft Foods Group, Inc. on its $58 billion merger with Heinz 
 InBev's $52 billion acquisition of Anheuser-Busch  
 GE on the $32 billion combination of its oil & gas business with Baker Hughes.  
 H. J. Heinz Company's $28 billion sale to an investor consortium consisting of 3G Capital and Berkshire Hathaway  
 Lorillard's $27.4 billion sale to Reynolds American 
 Unilever's $24 billion acquisition of Bestfoods  
 PepsiCo's $21 billion acquisition of The Pepsi Bottling Group and PepsiAmericas  
 GE's $18 billion sale of remaining 49% interest in NBCUniversal to Comcast
 GE's $13.5 billion pending acquisition of Alstom. 
 Diageo's $10 billion sale of Pillsbury to General Mills  
 The Hillshire Brands Company $8.6 billion sale to Tyson Foods. 
 Diageo's $8 billion purchase of Seagram's wine and spirits business  
 News Corporation's $6 billion acquisition of Dow Jones  
 PepsiCo's $5.4 billion acquisition of Wimm-Bill-Dann Foods  
 NewsCorp's separation of the company into 21st Century Fox and NewsCorp.

In July 2006, Effron co-founded Centerview Partners along with Robert Pruzan, formerly CEO of North America at Dresdner Kleinwort Wasserstein and President of Wasserstein Perella & Co. Additional Centerview co-founders included Stephen Crawford, former co-president at Morgan Stanley, and Adam Chinn, a former partner at Wachtell Lipton. James M. Kilts, former CEO of Gillette, heads the firm's private equity fund.

Other affiliations
Effron serves on the board of trustees of the Council on Foreign Relations (Vice-Chairman), Lincoln Center (Treasurer), the Metropolitan Museum of Art,  New Visions for Public Schools, Partnership for New York City, and Princeton University.  He also sits on the advisory board of The Hamilton Project at the Brookings Institution.

Active in the Democratic party, Effron was a prominent supporter of John Kerry's 2004 presidential campaign and an active supporter of Joe Biden's 2020 presidential campaign. He also hosted Obama at his Upper East Side Manhattan home in May 2014 and Hillary Clinton in June 2015. Effron contributes political and business commentary to outlets including the Financial Times, The Wall Street Journal, CNBC and other publications. In August 2022, Effron was appointed by President Joe Biden as a member of the President’s Intelligence Advisory Board.

References

External links
 Centerview Benefits from Wall St.'s Pivot to Smaller Banks, by David Gelles. The New York Times 
 The Deal Makers behind 2015 ‘s Biggest Tie Ups Dana Mattioli, Dana Cimilucca, Shayndi Raice The Wall Street Journal
 How to Foster Long-Term Innovation Investment, Center for American Progress, Co-authored by Blair Effron
 Centerview Partners’ relationship care brings blockbuster deals, from the Financial Times
Rubin to Join Centerview, a Young Firm.  The New York Times, August 12, 2010
The Case for an Employer Tax Break.  The Wall Street Journal, September 21, 2009
Murdoch Chose Advisers Versed In Family Firms.  The Wall Street Journal, May 3, 2007

1962 births
American bankers
American financial businesspeople
Columbia Business School alumni
Living people
Princeton University alumni
UBS people